Yauna (Yahuna) is an extinct Tucanoan language of Colombia.

References

Languages of Colombia
Tucanoan languages
Extinct languages of South America